Bosher Club is an Omani football club based in Bosher, Oman. The club is currently playing in the Oman Professional League, top division of Oman Football Association. Their home ground is Sultan Qaboos Sports Complex, but they also recognize the older Royal Oman Police Stadium as their home ground. Both stadiums are government owned, but they also own their own personal stadium and sports equipment, as well as their own training facilities.

History
The club was founded on 31 January 1972 and registered on 26 June 2002.

Being a multisport club
Although being mainly known for their football, Bosher Club like many other clubs in Oman, have not only football in their list, but also hockey, volleyball, handball, basketball, badminton and squash. They also have a youth football team competing in the Omani Youth league.

Colors, kit providers and sponsors
Bosher Club have been known since establishment to wear a full blue (with yellow stripes) or yellow (with blue stripes) (Away) kit (usually a darker shade of yellow), varying themselves from neighbors Muscat Club (Red) and Oman Club (Red) kits. Over the years, they have had numerous kit providers. As of now, Nike provides them with kits.

They have also had many different sponsors over the years. Currently, Al-Thahir Construction Company, Pocari Sweat and Al-Khalili Glass are featured on the team's shirt.

Honours and achievements

National titles
Oman First Division League (1): 
Winners 2013-14

Current squad

|-----
! colspan="9" bgcolor="#B0D3FB" align="left" |
|----- bgcolor="#DFEDFD"

|-----
! colspan="9" bgcolor="#B0D3FB" align="left" |
|----- bgcolor="#DFEDFD"

 

|-----`
! colspan="9" bgcolor="#B0D3FB" align="left" |
|----- bgcolor="#DFEDFD"

Personnel

Current technical staff

References

External links
Bousher Club Profile at Goalzz.com

1970 establishments in Oman
Association football clubs established in 1970
Football clubs in Oman
Oman Professional League
Sports clubs in Muscat, Oman